Harry Day (1898–1977) was a Royal Marine and RAF pilot during the Second World War, prisoner of war and noted escapee.

Harry Day may also refer to:
 Harry Day (politician) (1880–1939), British labour party politician, Member of Parliament 1924–1931, 1935–1939
 Harry Day (rugby union) (1863–1911), Welsh international rugby union forward
 Harry G. Day (born 1906), American chemist and professor
 Harry S. Day (1871–1956), Ohio State Treasurer

See also
Harold Day (disambiguation)
Henry Day (disambiguation)
Day (surname)